Horizon Therapeutics Public Ltd Co is a biopharmaceutical company focused on researching, developing, and commercializing medicines that address critical needs for people impacted by rare and rheumatic diseases. Horizon primarily markets products in the United States, which represented 97% of Horizon's 2019 worldwide sales. In 2014 Horizon executed a tax inversion to move its legal headquarters to Ireland to avail of Ireland's low tax rates and beneficial corporate tax system. On May 2, 2019, shareholders of the company approved the change of the company's name to Horizon Therapeutics plc.

Horizon's drug portfolio is focused on treatments for thyroid eye disease (TED), gout, rare diseases, and inflammatory diseases. Horizon's portfolio includes Tepezza (teprotumumab), Krystexxa (pegloticase), Actimmune (interferon gamma), Duexis (ibuprofen + famotidine), Pennsaid (diclofenac, 2% topical), Rayos/Lodotra (prednisone), Vimovo (naproxen/esomeprazole magnesium), Buphenyl (sodium phenylbutyrate), Procysbi (cysteamine bitartrate), and Ravicti (glycerol phenylbutyrate). In 2016, the company became a member of the Pharmaceutical Research and Manufacturers of America (PhRMA).

In December 2022, the company announced it would be acquired by Amgen for $27.8 billion.

Business
The company's lead product base includes Krystexxa, Duexis and Rayos. Outside the United States, Rayos is also known as Lodotra.

The company has cooperated with American Gastroenterological Association (AGA) Institute to launch a program named "Connect to Protect" which aims to help physicians and patients better understand non-steroidal anti-inflammatory drug (NSAID) risks. The program is planned to promote communications between physicians and patients about NSAIDs and gastrointestinal ulcers.

History 
In March 2014, the company executed a corporate tax inversion to Ireland by acquiring  Irish–based Vidara Therapeutics International for $660 million.  While Horizon's main operations and sales remained in the U.S., Horizon moved their "legal" headquarters to Ireland to avoid U.S. taxes.  In July 2015, the Wall Street Journal noted that Horizon were using their lower Irish corporate tax rate to acquire further U.S.–based life sciences firms (i.e. Horizon could afford to pay more).

In October 2014, the company acquired the U.S. sales and marketing rights to the osteoarthritis drug Pennsaid from Nuvo Research for $45 million. In March 2015, the company acquired Hyperion Therapeutics for $1.1 billion, increasing Horizon's orphan disease drug portfolio. In December, the company acquire Crealta Holdings for $510 million.

In September 2016, the company announced the acquisition of Raptor Pharmaceutical for $800 million, adding Procysbi and Quinsair to its rare drug portfolio.

In 2017, Horizon announced its intention to acquire River Vision Development Corp for $145 million, and continue the development of teprotumumab. In January 2020 - after showing very strong PhIII data - it was approved for the treatment of thyroid eye disease (TED), a rare, vision-threatening disease that previously had no FDA-approved treatment options. Horizon believes it can reach $1bn peak-sales in US alone.

In February 2021, the business announced it would acquire Viela Bio Inc for around $3 billion ($53 per share). In early 2022, the company signed a lease on a large research and development facility in Rockville, Maryland.

Acquisition by Amgen 
In December 2022, the company announced it would be acquired by Amgen for $27.8 billion ($116.50 in cash for each Horizon share, a 20% premium). The company was reportedly the center of a bidding war between Amgen, Johnson & Johnson and Sanofi.

See also
 Corporate tax inversions
 Ireland as a tax haven

References

External links
 

Pharmaceutical companies of Ireland
Companies listed on the Nasdaq
Manufacturing companies based in Dublin (city)
Tax inversions
Pharmaceutical companies established in 2005
Announced mergers and acquisitions